Doreen Anne Thomas, emeritus professor of Mechanical Engineering at Melbourne University, earned a BSc from the University of Cape Town, and another from the University of Witwatersrand. At Oxford she earned an MSc and a D.Phil in 1976, with a mathematical dissertation entitled Problems in Functional Analysis supervised by Hilary Priestley.

Her mathematical in network analysis work led to her contributions in electrical and mechanical engineering.

As professor in the many engineering schools, in mathematics and statistics and as associate dean of research and research training at Melbourne she has done much to encourage women to be engineers. The engineering faculty of Melbourne University honours her work by offering postdoctoral scholarships in her name. She is a  Fellow of the Australian Academy of Technological Sciences and Engineering and a Fellow of Engineers Australia. She was inducted into the Victorian Honour Roll of Women in 2019. She commercialised her mining software optimising mine design via the company MineOptima which was acquired by the mining software company RPM.

Selected publications

References

Australian engineers
Living people
Women engineers
Year of birth missing (living people)
Fellows of the Australian Academy of Technological Sciences and Engineering